The Istana Ampang Tinggi was a royal residence in Negeri Sembilan in Malaysia.

The palace was built without using any nails. It has a length of 66.5 feet and a width of 23.5 feet. It was ordered by Yam Tuan Imam, the 5th Yamtuan Besar of Negeri Sembilan. The palace was built between 1865 and 1870 at Ampang Tinggi ("High Dam") in Kuala Pilah on a ridge overlooking a wide expanse of paddy fields.

When it was completed, the ruler gave it to his daughter Puteri Cindai, when she married Tengku Muda Chik, the son of the 4th Yamtuan Radin. The palace stood six miles from Seri Menanti when, in 1953 the 8th Yamtuan, Tuanku Abdul Rahman gave permission for the istana to be dismantled and transported to its current location about three miles from Seremban. Today, it serves as a small museum containing weapons and other historical artefacts from Negeri Sembilan.

Further reading

External links 
 Journey Malaysia: Istana Ampang Tinggi

Royal residences in Malaysia
Buildings and structures in Negeri Sembilan
Tourist attractions in Negeri Sembilan